The 2015 La Course by Le Tour de France was the second edition of La Course by Le Tour de France, a one-day women's cycle race held in France. The race was run before the 21st stage of the 2015 Tour de France on 26 July. It was organised by the ASO and rated by the UCI as a 1.1 category race.

Route

Teams competing

Race summary

During the race the rain hammered down. The stones of the course were very slippery causing many crashes. Only 62 of the 196 riders who started the race finished. Dutch favorite Ellen van Dijk was involved in one of the first crashes. She broke her collarbone and had to abandon. Among other casualties were the world champion, Pauline Ferrand-Prévot, who went down in the closing kilometres, and Shelley Olds who crashed and remounted, only to lose her derailleur and be forced to abandon.

Result

See also
 2015 in women's road cycling

References

External links

 

2015 in women's road cycling
La Course by Le Tour de France
2015 in French sport